West Riding County Council (WRCC) was the county council of the administrative county of the West Riding of Yorkshire from 1 April 1889 to 31 March 1974. The council met at County Hall in Wakefield.

The county council had jurisdiction over the administrative county of the West Riding and therefore did not include county boroughs which were independent of the county council but associated with the county for other purposes. At the time of its formation in 1889 there were six county boroughs; Bradford, Halifax, Huddersfield, Leeds, Sheffield and York. The administrative county was reduced when the county boroughs of Rotherham (1902), Barnsley (1913), Dewsbury (1913), Wakefield (1915) and Doncaster (1927) were formed.

Political control
The county council consisted of elected councillors and co-opted county aldermen. The entire body of county councillors was elected every three years. Aldermen were additional members, there being a ratio of one alderman to three councillors. Aldermen had a six-year term of office, and one half of their number were elected by the councillors immediately after the triennial elections. This was the same in all county councils at this time, as defined by the Local Government Act 1888.

From the establishment of the county council in 1889 onwards the Liberal party won overall control of the council at successive county council elections, dominating the council from 1889 to 1914. Liberal domination of the council however was peppered with several years of no overall control; in 1903 and after 1912. At no point did the Liberals lose their administrative control of the council, and in the years it lacked an overall majority it relied on support from Independent and Liberal Unionist councilors.

References

Former county councils of England
1889 establishments in England
1974 disestablishments in England
West Riding of Yorkshire